Tomoyo is a feminine Japanese given name.

Possible writings
Tomoyo can be written using different kanji characters and can mean:
 知世, "wisdom, world"
 友世, "friend, world"
 倫世, "ethics, world"
 智代, "knowledge, world"
 灯代, "light, world"
 知葉, "wisdom, leaf"
 朋与, "friend, bestow"

The name can also be written in hiragana or katakana.

People with the name
 , Japanese actress and singer
 , Japanese voice actress
 , former member of the rock group Bon-Bon Blanco
 , Japanese television personality and businesswoman
 , Japanese film editor
 , Japanese former announcer
, Japanese voice actress

Fictional characters
 Tomoyo, a character from the novel Ghostwritten
 , a character from Cardcaptor Sakura
 , an alter-ego of Tomoyo Daidōji in Tsubasa: Reservoir Chronicle
 , a character from the manga series G-Taste
 , a character from the light novel series When Supernatural Battles Became Commonplace
 , a character from the manga series A Devil and Her Love Song
 , a character from the anime series True Tears
 , a character from the manga series Crimson Hero
 , a character from the visual novel, manga, and anime series Clannad
 , a character from the manga series Heaven's Lost Property
 , a character from the anime series Key the Metal Idol

See also 
Tomoyo After: It's a Wonderful Life
TOMOYO Linux, a Linux security module

References

Japanese feminine given names